England won the 1926 Ashes series against Australia, winning the last Test of the series after the first four matches were drawn.

Test series summary

First Test

Second Test

Third Test

Fourth Test

Fifth Test

England regained the Ashes by winning the final match. Because the series was at stake, the match was to be "timeless", i.e. played to a finish. Australia had a narrow first innings lead of 22. Jack Hobbs and Herbert Sutcliffe took the score to 49–0 at the end of the second day, a lead of 27. Heavy rain fell overnight, and next day the pitch soon developed into a traditional sticky wicket. England seemed certain to be bowled out cheaply and to lose the match. In spite of the very difficult batting conditions, however, Hobbs and Sutcliffe took their partnership to 172 before Hobbs was out for exactly 100. Sutcliffe went on to make 161 and in the end England won the game comfortably.

Ceylon
As on some previous visits to England, the Australian team had a stopover en route in Colombo and played a one-day single-innings match against the Ceylon national team which at that time did not have first-class status. The Australians won by 37 runs.

References

External links
 Australia in England, 1926 at Cricinfo
 Australia to England 1926 at Test Cricket Tours website 
 Australia in British Isles 1926 at CricketArchive website
  on Pathé News

Annual reviews
 Wisden Cricketers' Almanack 1927

Further reading
 Bill Frindall, The Wisden Book of Test Cricket 1877-1978, Wisden, 1979
 Chris Harte, A History of Australian Cricket, Andre Deutsch, 1993
 England v Australia: A compendium of Test cricket between the countries 1877-1968, by Ralph Barker & Irving Rosenwater, Batsford, 1969, .

1926 in Australian cricket
1926 in English cricket
1926 in Ceylon
1926
1926
International cricket competitions from 1918–19 to 1945
Sri Lankan cricket seasons from 1880–81 to 1971–72
1926